Matteo Rovere (born 22 January 1982) is an Italian director, screenwriter and producer. He's the youngest Italian film-maker to have won the Nastro d'argento for best producer, with I Can Quit Whenever I Want.

Life and career 
Born in Rome in 1982, Matteo Rovere started directing short films at very young age, and his shorts were screened at over 140 festivals.

In 2007, his short film Homo Homini Lupus won the Nastro d'Argento for best short film.

In 2009 he made his feature film debut with the coming of age drama A Game for Girls, which was entered into the competition at the 2008 Rome International Film Festival.
He debuts as film producer with the documentary Pietro Germi – Il bravo, il bello, il cattivo, presented at the 62° Cannes Film Festival.

In 2012 his second feature film as director Drifters debuts on theaters, the film is adapter from Sandro Veronesi novel with the same name and interpreted by Andrea Bosca, Miriam Giovanelli, Claudio Santamaria, Michele Riondino and Massimo Popolizio. The film was presented in London as global preview the year before in occasion of the British Film Institute Festival.

In 2014 he's film producer of Sydney Sibilia's I Can Quit Whenever I Want, film that makes more than 5 million euros at the box office, achieving 12 nominations for the David di Donatello and 5 nominations for Nastro d'argento. Matteo Rovere won the Nastro d'Argento for Best Producer.

In 2016 he wrote, directed and produced his third film Italian Race, starring Stefano Accorsi and Matilda De Angelis. It became one of the most successful box office hits in Italy that year, well received both by critics and audience. The film won best cinematography, best editing, best sound editing, best make-up artist and best musical effects at the 2017 David di Donatello's awards and one Nastro d'argento for best film editing. That year he also produced two sequels of I Can Quit Whenever I Want, entitled I Can Quit Whenever I Want: Masterclass and I Can Quit Whenever I Want: Ad Honorem.

In 2019 he directed the historical drama The First King: Birth of an Empire (Il primo re), starring Alessandro Borghi and Alessio Lapice. The film was nominated for eight Nastro d'argento awards such as Best Film and Best Director. The same year he was appointed as showrunner, producer and director of Romulus, a Sky Original tv series.

In 2020 he also produced, together with Ascent Film, the biopic The Bad Poet, about the last days of Gabriele D'Annunzio, and the claustrophobic thriller Shadows, with Mia Threapleton and Lola Petticrew.

Filmography

Director and screenwriter

Film 
 Gitanes – documentary (2004)
A Game for Girls (2008)
Drifters (2011)
Italian Race (2016)
The First King: Birth of an Empire (2019)

TV series 
Romulus (2020)

Producer 
 Homo homini lupus – short film (2006)
 Pietro Germi: Il bravo, il bello, il cattivo, regia di Claudio Bondì – documentary (2009)
 Ritratto di mio padre, directed by Maria Sole Tognazzi – documentary (2010)
 Oggi gira così – short film (2010)
 Altra musica – short film (2012)
 The Pills 1/2 – webseries (2013)
 The Pills – webseries (2013-2014)
 I Can Quit Whenever I Want, directed by Sydney Sibilia (2014)
 The Ice Forest, directed by Claudio Noce (2014)
 Zio Gianni - TV series (2014-2015)
 La prima volta (di mia figlia), directed by Riccardo Rossi (2015)
 The Pills – Sempre meglio che lavorare, directed by Luca Vecchi (2016) – executive producer 
 I Can Quit Whenever I Want: Masterclass, directed by Sydney Sibilia (2017)
 Moglie e marito, directed by Simone Godano (2017)
 The Italian Jobs: Paramount Pictures e l'Italia, directed by Marco Spagnoli – documentary (2017)
 I Can Quit Whenever I Want: Ad Honorem, directed by Sydney Sibilia (2017)
 Sembra mio figlio, directed by Costanza Quatriglio (2018)
 Ovunque proteggimi, directed by Bonifacio Angius (2018)
 The First King: Birth of an Empire (2019), directed by Matteo Rovere (2019)
 Croce e delizia, directed by Simone Godano (2019)
 The Champion, directed by Leonardo D'Agostini (2019)
 The Bad Poet (2020)
 Shadows (2020)
 Rose Island (2020)

Nominations and awards 
David di Donatello
 2014 - Nomanation for Best Producer - I Can Quit Whenever I Want
 2017 - Nomination for Best Film - Italian Race
 2017 - Nomination for Best Director - Italian Race
 2017 - Nomination for Best Original Screenplay - Italian Race
 2018 - Nomination for Best Producer - I Can Quit Whenever I Want - Masterclass and I Can Quit Whenever I Want - Ad honorem
 2020 - Nomination for Best Film - The First King: Birth of an Empire
 2020 - Nomination for Best Director - The First King: Birth of an Empire
 2020 - Nomination for Best Original Screenplay - The First King: Birth of an Empire
 2020 - Award for Best Producer - The First King: Birth of an Empire
Nastro d'argento
 2007 - Award for Best Short Film - Homo homini lupus
 2014 - Award for Best Producer - I Can Quit Whenever I Want
 2019 - Nomination for Best Director - The First King: Birth of an Empire
 2019 - Nomination for Best Film - The First King: Birth of an Empire
 2019 - Award for Best Producer - The First King: Birth of an Empire
2019 - Award for Best Producer - Il Campione
Globo d'oro
 2017 - Nomination for Best Screenplay - Italian Race

References

External links 
 

1982 births
Living people
Italian film directors
Italian television directors
Italian screenwriters
Italian male screenwriters
Film people from Rome
Nastro d'Argento winners
Italian film producers